The 2015 Utah Utes football team represented the University of Utah during the 2015 NCAA Division I FBS football season. The team was coached by eleventh year head coach Kyle Whittingham and played their home games in Rice-Eccles Stadium in Salt Lake City, Utah. They were members of the South Division of the Pac-12 Conference. They finished the season 10–3, 6–3 in Pac-12 play to finish in a tie for the South Division title. Due to their head-to-head loss to USC, they did not represent the South Division in the Pac-12 Football Championship Game. They were invited to the Las Vegas Bowl where they defeated rival BYU.

Schedule

Source:

Rankings

Game summaries

Michigan

Utah State

at Fresno State

at Oregon

California

Arizona State

at USC

Oregon State

at Washington

at Arizona

UCLA

Colorado

Las Vegas Bowl

References

Utah
Utah Utes football seasons
Las Vegas Bowl champion seasons
Utah Utes football